The Ministry of Agriculture, Livestock and Fisheries (MAGyP) of Argentina, commonly known simply as the Ministry of Agriculture, is a ministry of the national executive power that oversees production, commerce and health regulations in the agricultural, livestock and fishing industries.

The Ministry of Agriculture is one of the oldest portfolios in the Argentine government, having existed – under various names and incarnations – since 1898, when it was created by President Julio Argentino Roca. The ministry's current full name was adopted in 2019. The current minister of agriculture is Julián Domínguez, since 20 September 2021.

History
The Ministry of Agriculture of Argentina was first established in 1898 through Law 3727 enacted by President Julio Argentino Roca following the 1898 constitutional reform; the first minister responsible was Emilio Frers, a lawyer and businessman and member of the Sociedad Rural Argentina. The government's agricultural policies had previously been co-ordinated by the National Department of Agriculture, a subdivision of the Ministry of the Interior established by President Domingo Faustino Sarmiento in 1871. The Ministry of Agriculture maintained its ministerial status and autonomy until 1958, when it was reorganized into the Secretariat of Agriculture and Livestock within the Ministry of Economy by President Arturo Frondizi.

The portfolio briefly regained ministerial status during the de facto administrations of presidents Alejandro Lanusse (1972–1973) and Roberto Viola (1981), otherwise remaining a subdivision of the Ministry of Economy (with the exception of the 2002–2003 presidency of Eduardo Duhalde, during which it was a secretariat of the Ministry of Production).

In 2009 the secretariat was once again elevated to ministerial level and was given the responsibilities of the fisheries secretariat by President Cristina Fernández de Kirchner, under the name of Ministry of Agriculture, Livestock, Fisheries and Food; its first minister was Julián Domínguez. The Ministry retained its name and responsibilities during the remainder of Fernández de Kirchner's presidency, until it was renamed as Ministry of Agroindustry during the presidency of Mauricio Macri (2015–2019), with Ricardo Buryaile as minister.

On 5 September 2018 the ministry was briefly reorganized as a secretariat of the Ministry of Production once again as part of a large-scale cabinet reshuffle which reduced the number of ministries from 22 to 11. The ministry quickly regained its status on 2 August 2019, when it was given its current name of Ministry of Agriculture, Livestock and Fisheries.

Attributions
The attributions and responsibilities of the Ministry of Agriculture, Livestock and Fisheries are specified in Article 20 of the current Law of Ministries (Ley de Ministerios), published in 2019. According to this law, the Ministry is in charge of intervening in the establishment of tariffs and export and tariff refunds in the areas within its jurisdiction; defining the national state's commerce policy on agriculture, livestock and fisheries; promoting, organizing and participating in agriculture-related exhibits, fairs, contests and missions abroad; among many other responsibilities.

The issue of internal tariffs on agricultural exports has long been a contested issue between the Argentine government and the Argentine agricultural industry. The 2008 farm crisis, triggered by the Fernández de Kirchner administration's decision to impose a 44% tax on soybean exports resulted in farmers' strikes, mass protests and roadblocks. Agricultural exports constituted over half of Argentina's exports in 2019.

Structure and dependencies
The Ministry of Agriculture counts with a number of centralized and decentralized dependencies. The centralized dependencies, as in other government ministers, are known as secretariats (secretarías) and undersecretariats (subsecretarías); there are currently three of these:

Secretariat of Food and Bioeconomy (Secretaría de Alimentos y Bioeconomía)
Secretariat of Family Agriculture, Co-ordination and Territorial Development (Secretaría de Agricultura Familiar, Coordinación y Desarrollo Territorial)
Secretariat of Agriculture, Livestock and Fisheries (Secretaría de Agricultura, Ganadería y Pesca)
Undersecretariat of Agricultural Markets (Subsecretaría de Mercados Agropecuarios)
Undersecretariat of Administrative Management (Subsecretaría de Gestión Administrativa)
Direction of Press and Communication (Dirección de Prensa y Comunicación)

Additionally, the ministry counts with several decentralized dependencies, which are financially autonomous. These include the National Institute of Agricultural Technology (INTA), the National Food Safety and Quality Service (SENASA), the National Institute for Fisheries Research and Development (INIDEP), the National Vitiviniculture Institute (INV), the National Seeds Institute (INASE), the National Yerba Mate Institute, and Innovaciones Tecnológicas Agopecuarias S.A. (INTEA).

Headquarters

The Ministry of Agriculture has been headquartered at Av. Paseo Colón 922, in the Buenos Aires barrio of San Telmo, since 1919. The original design, drafted in 1911, is an eclectic building with Tudor, Gothic Revival and Beaux-Arts influences, representing the various currents and the architectural eclecticism popular in late 19th and early 20th century Buenos Aires. The complex consists of two twin buildings, the older of which houses the Agriculture Ministry, while the newest (inaugurated in 1931) originally served as the headquarters of Yacimientos Petrolíferos Fiscales, and later became the offices of the Dirección de Meteorología Nacional (now the Servicio Meteorológico Nacional). The overall work was designed by the Kimbau y Cía and the Andrés Vanelli e Hijos architectural studios.

Both buildings were renovated in 2010 by order of Minister Julián Domínguez; restoration works included various decor and the original lamps and chandeliers, as well as upgrading the air conditioning and computing networks.

List of ministers

References

External links
  

Agriculture
Argentina
Argentina
Argentina
Argentina
1898 establishments in Argentina
Agricultural organisations based in Argentina